John Allen "Al" Gamble (born March 11, 1969) is an American, Memphis, Tennessee and Birmingham, Alabama based, session musician, playing Hammond B-3 organ and keyboards. He is currently the keyboard player for St. Paul and The Broken Bones.

Early life
Gamble was born in Columbus, Georgia, United States, but his family moved to his parents' home town of Tuscumbia, Alabama (near Muscle Shoals), where he was raised. After graduating from the University of Alabama in 1991 he lived in Tuscumbia, until moving to Memphis in 1994 to pursue a career in music.

Career
Gamble grew up listening to his father's record collection, which included Jimmy Smith, Ray Charles, Jack McDuff and other jazz and soul artists on the Verve and Blue Note labels. He played in various bands during high school and college, and in 1992 joined the Shreveport-based Bluebirds, featuring Buddy Flett on guitar. Gamble spent a few years in Memphis as a Beale Street musician, backing such artists as Preston Shannon and A-440. In 2001, he formed the Gamble Brothers Band with his younger brother Chad Gamble (drums), Art Edmaiston (saxophone) and Will Lowrimore (bass). The band recorded three albums from 2001 to 2007. The first album, 10 Lbs. of Hum (2001), was released independently and featured Lowrimore on bass. The last two albums, Back to the Bottom (2003)  and Continuator (2006), were released on the Memphis-based label Archer Records. Back to the Bottom was the last recording to feature Lowrimore on bass, who left the band shortly after the album's release. Continuator featured bassist, Blake Rhea, who joined the band in 2003 to replace Lowrimore.

In 2003, the Gamble Brothers Band beat out more than 1,200 other artists to win the Billboard-sponsored Independent Music World Series award.

Edmaiston joined the Jacksonville-based touring band JJ Grey & MOFRO in 2007, and soon after that, the Gamble Brothers Band played a show opening for the Black Crowes in October 2007 at Mud Island Amphitheatre in Memphis, their final live performance for 12 years. The band reunited for a show  at the Crosstown Theater in Memphis on December 21, 2019.  Earlier in 2007, while Edmaiston was on a break from touring, he joined Gamble, Memphis guitar player Joe Restivo, and drummer George Sluppick to form The Grip, a four-piece jazz instrumental band specializing in boogaloo music. The Grip recorded the EP Grab This Thing for Archer Records (2007).

The road took Edmaiston away again, and Gamble continued to play with Restivo and Sluppick as a three-piece, forming the band The City Champs. The City Champs released two albums on Scott Bomar's Electraphonic label: The Safecracker (2009) and The Set Up (2010). The City Champs have toured regularly and opened for other acts, including the North Mississippi Allstars and Huey Lewis. The members' other musical projects took them in different directions, but after a long hiatus they reunited to create the critically acclaimed Luna '68, released in 2021 on Big Legal Mess Records.

The City Champs' music has been featured in the MTV series "$5 Cover" and in the Emmy Award-winning documentary film I Am A Man: From Memphis, A Lesson in Life.

On November 29, 2010, The City Champs took part in the filming of a new Memphis music documentary. Titled Take Me To The River, this Cody Dickinson/Martin Shore-produced film, released Sept. 12, 2014, showcases icons of the Memphis' music scene playing with up-and-coming young bands. The City Champs collaborated with harmonica legend Charlie Musselwhite and Muscle Shoals Rhythm Section bassist David Hood on bass to film a segment at Electraphonic Studios in Memphis. The film, which includes contributions from Terrance Howard and Snoop Dogg, was honored at the Raindance Film Festival awards ceremony in London as the Feature Film.

In January 2013, after learning about St. Paul and The Broken Bones from friend and guitarist Browan Lollar, Gamble was asked to add organ overdubs on the band's debut album Half The City, recorded in Muscle Shoals, Alabama. Later that year, Gamble joined the band full-time, prior to the release of the record in February 2014. St. Paul and The Broken Bones have toured extensively in the United States and Europe and opened two shows (June 9 in Atlanta; and July 11 in Buffalo, New York) for The Rolling Stones on the band's 2015 Zip Code Tour. In January 2016, St. Paul and the Broken Bones played a sold-out Carnegie Hall show as part of a four-concert series curated by Rosanne Cash called Carnegie Hall's Perspectives.

In February 2017, St. Paul and the Broken Bones headlined the Elton John AIDS Foundation Academy Awards viewing party in West Hollywood, California.

Gamble has recorded on more than 50 albums and on various film scores. He is credited with writing or co-writing more than 40 songs, according to BMI.  He has toured with The City Champs, singer/songwriter Charlie Mars, John Paul Keith and the 145s, Louisiana soul singer Marc Broussard, Charles Walker and the Dynamites, The Bo-Keys, and St. Paul and The Broken Bones.

Personal life
Al Gamble currently lives in Memphis, Tennessee.

Alabama Music Hall of Fame
Al Gamble and his brother Chad are listed as "Music Achievers" in the Alabama Music Hall of Fame.

Discography

Television performances
Lopez Tonight - w/Marc Broussard - June 13, 2011
CBS This Morning: Saturday -  w/St. Paul and the Broken Bones - March 28, 2014
The Late Late Show with Craig Ferguson - w/St. Paul and the Broken Bones - April 28, 2014
Jimmy Kimmel Live - w/St. Paul and the Broken Bones - June 23, 2014
ACL Presents: Americana Music Festival 2014 - w/St. Paul and the Broken Bones - November 22, 2014
Late Show with David Letterman - w/St. Paul and the Broken Bones - January 12, 2015
Late Show with Stephen Colbert - w/St. Paul and the Broken Bones - August 30, 2016
CBS This Morning: Saturday -  w/St. Paul and the Broken Bones - Sept. 10, 2016
CONAN on TBS - w/St. Paul and the Broken Bones - Sept. 19, 2016
Later with Jools Holland - w/St. Paul and the Broken Bones - Oct. 21, 2016
Bluegrass Underground, Season 6, Episode 11 - w/St. Paul and the Broken Bones - Nov. 16, 2016
MTV Live Setlist, Season 1, Episode 4 - w/St. Paul and the Broken Bones - Jan. 7, 2017
Austin City Limits, Season 42, Episode 12 - w/St. Paul and the Broken Bones - July 15, 2017
Jimmy Kimmel Live - w/St. Paul and the Broken Bones - Sept. 10, 2018
CBS This Morning: Saturday -  w/St. Paul and the Broken Bones - Oct. 13, 2018
Late Show with Stephen Colbert, Season 4, Episode 68 - w/St. Paul and the Broken Bones - Dec. 18, 2018
Late Night with Seth Meyers, Episode 801 - w/St. Paul and the Broken Bones - Feb. 18, 2019
CBS This Morning: Saturday -  w/St. Paul and the Broken Bones - Jan. 4, 2020
Late Show with Stephen Colbert - w/St. Paul and the Broken Bones - Jan. 27, 2022
CBS This Morning: Saturday -  w/St. Paul and the Broken Bones - Jan. 29, 2022

References

Living people
1969 births
Musicians from Columbus, Georgia
Musicians from Memphis, Tennessee
University of Alabama alumni
People from Tuscumbia, Alabama
Musicians from Alabama